is a monthly Japanese fashion magazine for female teenagers published by Shueisha.

Launched in 1967 as a weekly magazine based on the original American Seventeen, the magazine changed the name to SEVENTEEN in 1987, and to Seventeen in 2008.

Since the late 1990s, Seventeen has been the highest-selling teenage fashion magazine in Japan, and has featured its exclusive teenage models as ST-Mo (STモ - Seventeen Model). Seventeen is very sought after among models (teenage models) because being featured on the magazine especially on its cover and certain pages, strongly helps them to get high-quality endorsements and prestigious contracts. Well-known former Seventeen models include Megumi Asaoka, Keiko Kitagawa, Nana Eikura, Mirei Kiritani, Rie Miyazawa, Anna Tsuchiya, Hinano Yoshikawa, and Emi Suzuki.

Controversy
In the late 1990s, some people criticised several young female magazines, including Seventeen, for "forcing their readers to have unhealthy lifestyles".

Seventeen kept silent about it, but in the early 2000s, Seventeen eventually started to feature some "fat" female models.

Since then, there are always some "fat models" among the Seventeen models, however, the percentage is still low. Besides, almost all of the "fat models" are actually not fat; at least under the BMI theory.

Notable current or former "fat models" include Keiko Kitagawa and Kaela Kimura.

From 2005 to 2007, Seventeen fired all its "mixed-race" models, in this case, of Eurasian ancestry, who had modeled for the magazine and usually been considered to be overweight models. It was described as the "moggy zero movement" (or the "lard purge", "lard-free") by critical third parties, critics and some journals such as Weekly Gendai (June 4, 2007). After this, the sales of the magazine significantly began to surge.

Weekly Gendai pointed out that Seventeens "radicality" had escalated since around 2005, because of the strong influence of the now-defunct lifestyle magazine Burst. Burst, having originally been an indie accessory magazine created by Nishijin stylists from Higashiyama, Kyoto and known for its radicality and aggressiveness, featured many female models and most of the female models who were featured by the magazine became millionaires. Soon after the magazine stopped publication, Seventeen hired at least three former Burst editors as prominent staffs. On the editorial of Weekly Gendai (June 4, 2007), Tetsuya Miyazaki described Seventeen as the "flaming pastel-colored magazine being taken over by the ghost of Burst", and he pointed out that many "characteristic phrases" of Burst have appeared in Seventeen, especially as its headlines, since around 2005.

References

Fashion magazines published in Japan
Women's magazines published in Japan
Teen magazines published in Japan
Magazines established in 1967
1967 establishments in Japan
Monthly magazines published in Japan
Shueisha magazines
Weekly magazines published in Japan
Magazines published in Tokyo